The Bridge of Praia da Barra is a modern bridge, situated over a confluence of the Ria Aveiro, in the civil parish of Gafanha da Nazaré, municipality of Ílhavo, in the Portuguese district of Aveiro. The bridge is situated on the western coast of Portugal, in the district of Aveiro, where the Ria Aveiro connects to the Atlantic Ocean. 

To the south is the beach of Costa Nova do Prado and north by the beach of São Jacinto. Nearby is the lighthouse of Ponte da Barra and coastal seawall, that delimits the  southern entrance to the port of Aveiro. The breakwater separates the northern and southern beaches, is close to the Church of the Sagrada Família and campsite of Barra, that belong to the tourist route of Luz/Centro.

See also
 List of bridges in Portugal

External links
 Images and notes

Buildings and structures in Aveiro, Portugal
Praia da Barra